Hollander is a surname.  "Hollander" is a Dutch term for people from the Netherlands, or specifically Holland proper. Variants of Germanic origin include Hollaender and Holländer.

People
 Anthony Hollander (born c. 1960), British academic
 Audrey Hollander (born 1979), American pornographic actress
 Christian Hollander (c.1510-15 – 1589), Dutch composer
 Bernard Hollander (1864–1934), London psychiatrist 
 David Hollander (born 1968), American television writer, producer, and director
 Edith Holländer (1900–1945), mother of diarist Anne Frank
        
 Friedrich Hollaender (1896–1976), German composer
 Gustav Hollaender (1855–1915), German composer
 Han Hollander (1886–1943), Dutch journalist
 Jacob Hollander (1871–1940), American economist and historian of economic thought
 John Hollander (born 1929–2013), poet

 Lorin Hollander (born 1944), American classical concert pianist
 Neil Hollander (born 1939), American filmmaker and writer
 Nicole Hollander (born 1939), American cartoonist, author of Sylvia
 Paul Hollander (born 1932), American writer, academic and journalist
 Robert Hollander (1933—2021), American academic and translator
 Samuel Hollander (born 1937), historian of economic thought
 Tom Hollander (born 1967), British actor
  (1892–1973), German writer
 Xaviera Hollander (born 1943), Dutch call girl and madam
 Zander Hollander (1923–2014), footballer, journalist, editor and archivist

See also 

 Den Hollander